Ray James Woods (February 2, 1895 – October 1965) was an American college basketball standout for Illinois in the 1910s. A guard, Woods helped lead the Fighting Illini to two Big Ten Conference championships in 1915 and 1917, with the former being an undefeated 16–0 season that resulted in a retroactive national championship. In all three seasons he played at the school, Woods was named an All-American and was honored as the Helms Foundation National Player of the Year as a senior in 1916–17. He was Illinois' first-ever All-American in basketball and teamed up with his brother, Ralf (a forward), in guiding the school to their first era of basketball dominance.

Honors

 1917 - Helms National Player of the Year
 1915, 1916, 1917 - First Team All-American
 1915, 1916, 1917 - First-team All-Big Ten
 2004 - Elected to the "Illini Men's Basketball All-Century Team"
 September 13, 2008 - Honored as one of the thirty-three honored jerseys which hang in the State Farm Center to show regard for being the most decorated basketball players in the University of Illinois' history.

Statistics

References

1895 births
1965 deaths
All-American college men's basketball players
American men's basketball players
Basketball players from Illinois
Evanston Township High School alumni
Guards (basketball)
Illinois Fighting Illini men's basketball players
Sportspeople from Evanston, Illinois